A partial solar eclipse occurred on December 25, 2000, also known as the "Christmas 2000 Solar Eclipse". A solar eclipse occurs when the Moon passes between Earth and the Sun, thereby totally or partly obscuring the image of the Sun for a viewer on Earth. A partial solar eclipse occurs in the polar regions of the Earth when the center of the Moon's shadow misses the Earth. 
It is also the last solar eclipse of the 20th century.

Christmas 
This is the first Solar Eclipse on Christmas day since the annular solar eclipse of 1954.

Images 

Animated path

Related eclipses

Eclipses of 2000 
 A total lunar eclipse on January 21.
 A partial solar eclipse on February 5.
 A partial solar eclipse on July 1.
 A total lunar eclipse on July 16.
 A partial solar eclipse on July 31.
 A partial solar eclipse on December 25.

Solar eclipses 2000–2003

Metonic series

References

External links 

 On Christmas Day, 2000, alert sky watchers across North America can enjoy a partial solar eclipse.
 Second Millennium, Last Eclipse, May 1, 2001 APOD, from Cary, North Carolina

2000 12 25
2000 in science
2000 12 25
December 2000 events